Kedleston is a village and civil parish in the Amber Valley district of Derbyshire, approximately  north-west of Derby. Nearby places include Quarndon, Weston Underwood, Mugginton and Kirk Langley. The population at the 2011 Census was less than 100. Details are included in the civil parish of Mackworth, Amber Valley.

History
Kedleston was mentioned in the Domesday book as belonging to Henry de Ferrers and having a mill. It was valued at 20 shillings.

The name of the village derives from Ketel’s tūn, the homestead belonging to Ketel, from the Old Norse Ketill

The medieval village was demolished by the Curzons to build Kedleston Hall, the historic residence of the Curzon family now run by the National Trust. The parish Church adjacent to the hall All Saints is all that remains of the original village and is in the care of the Churches Conservation Trust.

Notable residents
Robert of Courçon, English cardinal, was born here in the 12th century.

George Curzon, 1st Marquess Curzon of Kedleston (1859–1925), Viceroy of India and Foreign Secretary.

See also
Listed buildings in Kedleston

References

External links

 Golf club
 All Saints Church

Villages in Derbyshire
Civil parishes in Derbyshire
Geography of Amber Valley